Walter, Walt or Wally Williams may refer to:

Arts and entertainment
Walter Heath Williams, Victorian landscape artist
Walter Williams (painter) (1834–1906), Victorian landscape painter
Dootsie Williams or Walter Williams (1911–1991), American record executive and producer
Walter H. Williams (1920–1998), American-born artist, painter, printmaker, and sculptor
Bill Maynard or Walter Frederick George Williams (1928-2018), British comedian and actor
Walter Williams (born 1943), member of The O'Jays
Walter Jon Williams (born 1953), American science fiction writer
Walter Williams (comedian filmmaker), Saturday Night Live writer who created Mr. Bill
Zelooperz or Walter Williams (born 1993), American rapper

Sports

American football
Walt Williams (cornerback) (born 1954), American football player
Wally Williams (American football) (born 1971), American football player
Walter Williams (running back) (born 1977), American football player

Other sports
Pop Williams (Walter Merrill Williams, 1874–1959), American baseball player
Wal Williams (1904–1982), Australian rules footballer for Hawthorn
Jack Williams (footballer, born 1906) (Walter John Williams, 1906–1982), English footballer
Sam Williams (basketball, born 1924) (Walter Williams, 1924–2012), American college basketball coach
Wally Williams (water polo) (fl. 1950), New Zealand water polo player
Walt Williams (baseball) (1943–2016), American MLB player
Walter Ray Williams Jr. (born 1959), American bowler
Walt Williams (born 1970), American basketball player
Walter Williams (footballer) (1983–2018), Honduran footballer
Walt Williams (athlete) (born 1985), Grenadian track and field athlete

Other people
Walter Williams (centenarian) (1842–1959), American who claimed to be the last surviving veteran of the American Civil War
Walter Williams (journalist) (1864–1935), American who founded the Missouri School of Journalism
Walter McAdoo Williams (1891–1959), North Carolina textile executive
Walter C. Williams (1919–1995), American engineer
Dub Williams (Walter C. Williams, 1927–2014), American politician
Walter E. Williams (1936–2020), American economist
Walter Lee Williams (born 1948), American academic and FBI Ten Most Wanted fugitive